Barbara Penner (born 1970) is an architectural historian and Professor of Architectural Humanities at the Bartlett School of Architecture, University College London. She is a specialist in the history of small spaces, specifically the bathroom and toilet, and has written on the institution of the honeymoon in 19th century North America.

Penner received her BA in English literature and history of art from McGill University in 1994, her Master of Science in architectural history from University College London in 1996, and her	PhD from Birkbeck College in 2003.

Barbara has received a variety of fellowships and awards, including from The Leverhulme Trust, The Clark Art Institute, Cornell University, the Winterthur Museum and the Gilder-Lehrman Institute for American History. She has recently concluded a major Humanities in the European Research Area Joint Research Programme grant, Printing the Past: Architecture, Print Culture, and Uses of the Past in Modern Europe, led by the Oslo School of Architecture and Design, with partners from digital media lab Factum Arte, Ghent University, Leiden University, Musée d’Orsay, and the Victoria & Albert Museum.

Selected publications
Gender space architecture: An interdisciplinary introduction. Routledge, London, 1999. (Edited with Iain Borden and Jane Rendell) 
Ladies and gents: Public toilets and gender. Temple University Press, 2009. (Edited with Olga Gershenson) 
Newlyweds on tour: Honeymooning in nineteenth-century America. University Press of New England, Lebanon, 2009. 
Bathroom. Reaktion Books, 2013.  (RIBA President's Award for Outstanding University-Located Research, 2014)

References

External links
https://placesjournal.org/author/barbara-penner/
http://www.architectural-review.com/archive/viewpoints-barbara-penner/8650018.fullarticle

1970 births
Living people
Academics of University College London
Bathrooms
Architectural historians
Alumni of Birkbeck, University of London
McGill University alumni
Alumni of University College London